Mitko Mitkov (Bulgarian: Митко Митков; born 28 August 2000) is a Bulgarian footballer who plays as a midfielder for Septemvri Sofia.

Career

CSKA Sofia
On 31 May 2017 he made his debut for CSKA Sofia in а match against Dunav Ruse.

Bерое 
After making only a few official appearances for CSKA Sofia, in September 2022 Mitkov was loaned out to Beroe.

Career statistics

Club

References

Honours
CSKA Sofia
 Bulgarian Cup: 2020–21

External links
 

2000 births
Living people
Bulgarian footballers
Bulgaria under-21 international footballers
Bulgaria youth international footballers
PFC CSKA Sofia players
PFC Litex Lovech players
PFC Beroe Stara Zagora players
FC Septemvri Sofia players
First Professional Football League (Bulgaria) players
Second Professional Football League (Bulgaria) players
Association football midfielders